Chester Milton Southam (October 4, 1919 – April 15, 2002) was an immunologist and oncologist at Memorial Sloan Kettering Cancer Center and Cornell University Medical College; he went to Thomas Jefferson University in 1971 and worked there until the end of his career. He ran many experiments involving the injection of live cancer cells into human subjects, without disclosing that they were cancer cells, and using subjects with questionable ability to consent, such as incarcerated people and senile patients in long-term care at a hospital. The New York State Attorney General encouraged the Board of Regents of the University of the State of New York to take away Southam's medical license. Regardless, he went on to be president of the American Association for Cancer Research.

Life
Southam earned a Bachelor of Science degree and a master's degree from the University of Idaho and his medical degree from Columbia University, graduating in 1947.  He became an intern at Presbyterian Hospital in New York City in 1947. In the following year he was promoted from clinical fellow to attending physician at the Memorial Hospital for Cancer and also received a promotion from research fellow to full member at the Chief Division Virology/Immunology.  He joined the faculty of Cornell's medical college in 1951 and was eventually promoted to full professor.

From the mid-1950s to the mid-1960s, Southam conducted clinical research on people without their informed consent, in which he injected cancer cells (HeLa cells) into their skin, to see if their immune system would reject the cancer cells or if the cells would grow.  He did this to patients under his care or others' care, and to prisoners.  In 1963, doctors Avir Kagan, David Leichter and Perry Fersko of Jewish Chronic Disease Hospital objected to the lack of consent in his experiments and reported him to the Regents of the University of the State of New York which found him guilty of fraud, deceit, and unprofessional conduct, and in the end he was placed on probation for a year. Southam's research was conducted in an era when cancer research was closely followed in the mainstream media; his experiments and the case at the Regents were reported in The New York Times.

In the 1950s, Southam also tested the West Nile Virus as a potential virotherapy; he injected it into over 100 cancer patients who had terminal cancer and few treatment options.  This work had some good results and was also reported in The New York Times, but some people he injected got severe cases of West Nile fever; he went on to do further research to see if he could "train" the virus to kill cancer without the common side effects of chemotherapy.

Southam was later elected president of the American Association for Cancer Research. In 1971, Southam left his positions at Memorial Sloan Kettering and Cornell to become the head of The Division of Medical Oncology at Thomas Jefferson University Hospital and a professor of medicine at Thomas Jefferson University Medical College; he held these positions until the end of his career in 1979.

References

1919 births
2002 deaths
American virologists
Boise State University alumni
Columbia University Vagelos College of Physicians and Surgeons alumni
Cornell University faculty
Thomas Jefferson University faculty
Medical ethics
Memorial Sloan Kettering Cancer Center physicians